The Georgetown Law Journal is a student-edited scholarly journal published at Georgetown University Law Center. It is the flagship law review of the Georgetown University Law Center.

Overview 
The Georgetown Law Journal is headquartered at Georgetown University Law Center in Washington, D.C. and has published more than 500 issues since its inception, as well as the widely used Annual Review of Criminal Procedure (ARCP), a comprehensive practitioner's guide to criminal procedure. The Journal is the only top law journal to consistently publish on time. , it was the sixth-ranked law review . The Journal is currently, and always has been, run by law students.

History 

Volume 1, Issue 1 was published in November 1912, under the supervision of Editor-in-Chief Eugene Quay. At the time, an annual subscription to the new Journal cost one dollar. The first article was titled “The 125th Anniversary of the Drafting of the Constitution of the United States.” In a three-paragraph statement of purpose, the editors of the new Journal proclaimed:

Membership 

Today, the Journal employs approximately 100 second- and third-year law students—about 50 in their graduating year who serve in editorial positions and 50 in intermediate years who serve as staff. The staff collect and check sources, performing technical edits and checking for typographical errors. The upperclass students are tasked with administering the Journal‘s daily operations.

In order to gain journal membership, first-year students are permitted to participate in the Write On competition after completing their final exams in the spring semester. The competition is administered by the Georgetown Law Office of Journal Administration.

Students are offered positions on the Journal based on the following methods:  
 Based on the student's score in the Write On competition
 Based on a combination of Write On score and first-year grades
 Based on a personal statement detailing the contribution the student will make to the Journal's diversity.

Annual Review of Criminal Procedure 

The Annual Review of Criminal Procedure (ARCP) is a comprehensive, topic-by-topic summary of federal criminal procedure. The goal of the ARCP—which is written, updated, and edited by members of The Georgetown Law Journal—is to provide readers with an objective, concise, and accurate overview of criminal procedure in the federal courts.

The ARCP serves as a practical aid to a diverse readership that includes prosecutors and defense attorneys, judges and their law clerks, and prisoners assisting in their own defense or appeal. Over eleven thousand copies are distributed annually. The ARCP is sold at a discount to prisoners.

The ARCP includes a preface, often written by a well-regarded legal practitioner, academic, or judge. The 2012 preface was written by United States Attorney General Eric Holder. The 2015 preface, written by Judge Alex Kozinski of the United States Court of Appeals for the Ninth Circuit, critiqued many aspects of the criminal justice system. The United States Department of Justice published a letter responding to Judge Kozinski's preface, and the dispute generated significant media coverage.

References

External links 
Georgetown Law Journal

American law journals
Georgetown University academic journals
General law journals
Law journals edited by students
Georgetown University Law Center
Publications established in 1912